Geneva General Hospital is a 132-bed hospital in upstate New York with additional outpatient services via clinics. It was founded in 1898 and also operates two nursing homes and a nursing school; the latter's program offers a two-year A.S. (Associate degree in Science).

History
Geneva General Hospital joined Finger Lakes Health (FHL), described by The New York Times as "a consortium of hospitals and clinics in the region." To expand access to medical specialties for Geneva General and others in FHL, the latter began a clinical collaboration with a larger upstate medical organization.

In addition to its Marion S. Whelan School of Practical Nursing, with 1934 roots to an 1898-founded earlier nursing school (as part of the hospital's founding), Geneva General has an affiliation to Finger Lakes College of Nursing & Health Sciences;

References

  

1898 establishments in New York (state)
Hospitals in New York (state)